Pháp Loa (法螺; 1284–1330) was a Vietnamese Thiền Buddhist monk of the Trúc Lâm Yên Tử sect, and second patriarch of that sect. He was a disciple of Buddhist king Trần Nhân Tông (1258–1308).

A recently discovered inscription at Thanh Mai temple gives biographical details similar to the Tam tổ thực lục.

References

1284 births
1330 deaths
Trần dynasty Buddhist monks
Thiền Buddhists